Gangs of Haseepur is an Indian reality comedy show, which premiered on 26 April 2014. It airs on Zee TV. The show replaced Bh Se Bhade.

Director and content
Pankaj Saraswat for Violetpicture Company

Judges
Mandira Bedi
Tanishaa Mukerji

Host
Ragini Khanna
Krushna Abhishek
Raju Srivastav
Bharti Singh
Suresh Menon
Sugandha Mishra
Srikant Maski

References

Hindi-language television shows
2014 Indian television series debuts
Indian reality television series
Zee TV original programming
Indian comedy television series
Indian television sketch shows
2014 Indian television series endings